The Six Days of Fiorenzuola is a six-day track cycling race held annually in Fiorenzuola, Italy. The event was first held in 1998.

Winners

References

Cycle races in Italy
Sport in Emilia-Romagna
Province of Piacenza
Fiorenzuola
Recurring sporting events established in 1998
1998 establishments in Italy